Renaud Boucher (born 7 August 1964) is a French swimmer. He competed in the men's 100 metre backstroke at the 1988 Summer Olympics.

References

External links
 

1964 births
Living people
French male breaststroke swimmers
Olympic swimmers of France
Swimmers at the 1988 Summer Olympics
Sportspeople from Toulouse
Mediterranean Games bronze medalists for France
Mediterranean Games medalists in swimming
Swimmers at the 1987 Mediterranean Games
20th-century French people
21st-century French people